Dacrycarpus dacrydioides, commonly known as kahikatea (from Māori) and white pine, is a coniferous tree endemic to New Zealand. A podocarp, it is New Zealand's tallest tree, gaining heights of 60 m and a life span of 600 years. It was first described botanically by the French botanist Achille Richard in 1832 as Podocarpus dacrydioides, and was given its current binomial name Dacrycarpus dacrydioides in 1969 by the American botanist David de Laubenfels. Analysis of DNA has confirmed its evolutionary relationship with other species in the genera Dacrycarpus and Dacrydium.

In Māori culture, it is an important source of timber for the building of waka and making of tools, of food in the form of its berries, and of dye. Its use for timber and its damp fertile habitat, ideal for dairy farming, have led to its decimation almost everywhere except South Westland.

Kahikatea seeds have fleshy structures called receptacles attached to them, which encourage birds such as kererū and tūī to eat them and disperse the seeds. The water storage ability of this structures may also be to protect seeds from drying out. It supports many smaller plants in its own branches, which are called epiphytes; 100 different species have been recorded on one tree alone.

Description 
It has a 600 year life span and gains maturity after between 250 and 450 years. Near the base of the tree, the roots are typically buttressed and grooved. The wood itself is odourless and white. The majority of the trunk is branchless—in adults around three quarters—and has grey or dark grey coloured bark which falls off thickly in flakes. Young adults have no branches in a third to a half of the trunk and have a conic shape.

In juveniles the leaves are 3–7 (reaching 4 mm in young adults) by 0.5–1 mm and a dark green to red colour that come to a marked point. They are narrow, arranged in almost opposite pairs spreading away from a wider base, and curved like a scythe. In adulthood the leaves change dramatically and are a brown-green colour and just 1–2 mm long, waxy, and grow overlapping one another tightly.

As a conifer, the kahikatea has no flowers and instead has cones. Male cones, which occur on different trees to female ones, are 1 cm long and rectangular. The pollen is a pale yellow colour and has a three-pored or trisaccate shape that is distinctive in the New Zealand flora and so can be identified easily. The fruit is highly modified with a yellow-orange fleshy receptacle that is 2.5–6.5 mm long. The purple-black seed is roughly spherical and 4–6 mm in diameter. Both the seed and the ovary are covered with a thin layer of wax. The kahikatea has a diploid chromosome count of 20.

Phytochemistry 
Several different glycosides have been isolated from the leaves; the tricetin 3’,5’-di-O-/β-glucopyranoside and 3’-0-β-xylopyranoside have been found only in the kahikatea. The receptacles and seeds have been found to contain anthocyanins, rare in gymnosperms, which it was suggested in one 1988 paper make the fruit as a whole more attractive to prospective animal dispersers.

Taxonomy 

The kahikatea was first described in 1832 by the French botanist Achille Richard in his Essai d'une Flore de la Nouvelle Zélande (Essay On The Flora of New Zealand) as Podocarpus dacrydioides. There is an earlier record given in the 1825 issue of Mémoires du Muséum d'histoire naturelle as Podocarpus thujoides, but it lacks a description. It was superfluously named Dacrydium excelsum by Allan Cunningham in the 1838 issue of Annals of Natural History, and transferred to the genus Nageia by Otto Kuntze in 1891. It was given its current binomial name, Dacrycarpus dacrydioides, in 1969 by American botanist David de Laubenfels.

Etymology 
Dacrycarpus means tear shaped fruit, and the specific epithet dacrydioides is after its similarity to species in the genus Dacrydium. Common names include kahikatea, from the Māori language, and white pine. Other Māori names recorded by 19th century ethnographers include: katea, kaikatea, koroī,  kōaka, kahika, and the name kāī (for the young tree).

Evolution 
A 2022 study in Molecular Phylogenetics and Evolution, found a phylogeny, or evolutionary tree, in which kahikatea is found to be within a Darcydioid clade. This group of species that share a common ancestor also gave rise to the other Dacrycarpus species as well as those in the genus Darcydium. They suggested it diverged from a common ancestor around 60 million years ago, in the early paleogene. This is represented in the cladogram below.

Distribution and habitat 

The kahikatea is endemic to the North, South, and Stewart Islands of New Zealand. It inhabits mostly lowland forests between 0 and 600m above sea level, though may in rare cases reach montane areas. It used to dominate a swamp forest type that now exists almost only on the South Westland region of the South Island. Kahikatea prefers flooded or alluvial soils with low levels of drainage, which in Westland occur from post glaciation events.

Ecology

Dispersal 
Under optimal circumstances a mature kahikatea can produce  of fruit, equivalent to 4.5 million seeds, in a year. The fruit contains a special fleshy structure called a receptacle which helps attract birds such as the kererū, tūī, and bellbird, who then eat the fruit and disperse the seed elsewhere. One 2008 study in the New Zealand Journal of Ecology found a mean retention time of kahikatea seeds in kererū of 44.5 minutes.  It was suggested in a 1989 study that the high water content of the receptacle may also help protect the seeds, which are vulnerable to drying out, from dry conditions. It may also serve as a storage vessel for water. The bluish seeds have very strong UV reflectance, which is visible to some species of birds.

Epiphytes 
Kahikatea can support a vast number of non-parasitic plants that live in its branches, called epiphytes. One 2002 study identified between 90 and 100 species occurring on one mature tree. This included 49 vascular plants and over 50 non-vascular plants, which the authors identified as comparable to the number found on a Prumnopitys exigua in Bolivian cloud forest.

Competition 
Intraspecific competition between kahikatea trees was found in a 1999 study to be an important factor in their survival and overall success, affecting both the rates of growth and of mortality. Older trees have a particularly large advantage over resources compared to newer ones, and also have higher growth rates. Following flooding or other natural events, the kahikatea has been found to require an open canopy in order to re-establish. Because of the consistency of these events in South Westland however, many forested areas don't progress beyond regaining kahikatea and rimu, as other species, such as kāmahi, need the environment to improve before they can return.

Conservation 
Prior to the arrival of humans in New Zealand around 75% of the country was covered in trees, and kahikatea dominated its own and once widespread kahikatea forest type. Even after the burning of many forests by early Māori, there still remained large remnant forests which European settlers came upon in the 18th and 19th centuries. Prospects for use as timber were accelerated by the vast numbers of straight and tall trees, but because the wood is soft and odourless, it was made into pulp, barrels and boxes–butter boxes in particular were made mostly out of kahikatea. The kahikatea's usually flat habitat, with its damp and fertile soil, was also a prime location for dairy farming. Together this led to the felling of much of the remaining forests in the North and South Islands during the late 19th and early 20th centuries. Today they are confined mostly to the South Westland region of the South Island, though small remnants still exist in some places.

Conservation efforts have focused on protecting and fencing kahikatea forests around the country. Riccarton Bush is one notable example of forest remnant protection. The near  reserve was held in the Deans family for 70 years before it was gifted to Christchurch by them in 1914, and subsequently formally protected in the Riccarton Bush Bill. It is the only surviving kahikatea forest remnant in the entire Canterbury Plains, and contains trees up to 600 years old. Reservation of stands may not totally protect kahikatea, however, because the alluvial plains that they favour are prone to upheaval and erosion and so trees may still become damaged. Forest remnants outside of South Westland face the threat of never returning to their natural states, as a result of their small size, threats from weed species, and grazing by livestock. Despite this, the kahikatea has been classified as Least concern by the International Union for Conservation of Nature and "Not Threatened" by the New Zealand Threat Classification System, which gives it an estimated population of above 100,000.

In Māori culture 
In Māori mythology the kahikatea is a child of Tāne, the god of forests and birds, and Hine-wao-riki. It served as an important source of wood for the making of tools, of dye, and of food from its berries.

19th century British ethnographers Richard Taylor, Eldson Best, and William Colenso all recorded the fruit of kahikatea being eaten, and that it was given its own name: koroī. Best described berries being collected in a basket and then hoisted down using a cord. J. H. Kerry-Nicholls and William Colenso both recorded a blue or black dye being obtained from the soot of burning the kahikatea's resin or heart wood, called kāpara or māpara. This was described as then being used in tattooing. This resin was also used as chewing gum.

The wood could be made into canoes, called waka, but Best recorded that because of the softness of the wood they were far inferior to those made from tōtara. The heartwood was far stronger and R. H. Matthews described it as being used in tools and weapons such as spears. Medicinal applications were described by W. H. Goldie, who recorded the leaves being used to cure "internal complaints" as a decoction or in a steam bath.

References

External links
 Gymnosperm Database - Dacrycarpus dacrydioides

dacrydioides
Trees of New Zealand
Trees of mild maritime climate
Least concern plants